The Lekarti church of St Nino is a Georgian Orthodox Church located 2 km north-east of the village of Lekit of Qakh District, northwestern Azerbaijan, on the border with Georgia. The village's oldest name "Lekarti" (Georgian: ლექართი) is of Georgian origins and means "the place of Georgians". Among the Dagestani Lezgins the village is also known as "Georgians' village". In written historic courses which have been saved up to the present, the village has been mentioned for the first time in a Georgian Gospel's Anderdzi (postscript), written in 1300-1310, during the reign of king George V the Brilliant of Georgia. It is said that catholicos of Georgia Ekvtime III visited Lekarti Saint Nino church, then part of the Kak-Eliseni district of the Kakheti province of Kingdom of Georgia.

See also 
 Church of Kish
 Bana cathedral
 Katskhi Monastery

References 

Churches in Azerbaijan
Eastern Orthodox churches in Azerbaijan